Marin Čilić was the defending champion and successfully defended his title, defeating Tommy Haas in the final, 6–3, 6–4.

Seeds

Draw

Finals

Top half

Bottom half

Qualifying

Seeds

Qualifiers

Qualifying draw

First qualifier

Second qualifier

Third qualifier

Fourth qualifier

References
 Main Draw
 Qualifying Draw

PBZ Zagreb Indoors - Singles
2014 Singles
2014 PBZ Zagreb Indoors